Yesh Atid–Telem was a centrist parliamentary faction in Israel. It was formed in March 2020 by Yair Lapid's Yesh Atid party and Moshe Ya'alon's Telem party after the dissolution of the larger Blue and White alliance.

History
Ahead of the April 2019 election, the leader of the Yesh Atid party, Yair Lapid, and the leader of the Israel Resilience Party, Benny Gantz, announced the formation of a joint list known as "Blue and White", which also included the Telem party, led by Moshe Ya'alon, and Independent politician Gabi Ashkenazi. It was decided that Gantz and Lapid would run together as candidates for prime minister, and would rotate the role between themselves. Blue and White came in second place in the April election, receiving 26.13% of the vote, and tying with the rival Likud party in the number of Knesset seats, with both getting 35.

However, the term of the twenty-first Knesset was short-lived, as a majority of MKs voted to dissolve the Knesset following the failure of the Likud leader, Benjamin Netanyahu, to form a governing coalition. A snap election took place on 17 September 2019, resulting in Blue and White coming in first with 33 Knesset seats and 25.95% of the vote. After failing to form a coalition once again, Netanyahu returned the mandate to form a government back to President Reuven Rivlin, who, in turn, bestowed it on Gantz. After the mandate expired, Gantz was similarly unable to form a government. After a two-week period passed, (in which any Member of the Knesset could be chosen to form a coalition) the twenty-Second Knesset was dissolved and an unprecedented third snap election was called for March 2020.

In December 2019, ahead of upcoming elections for the twenty-third Knesset, it was agreed that Gantz would be Blue and White's sole candidate for prime minister. In the election, Blue and White lost their top position to a resurgent Likud party, with B&W keeping its 33 seats and Likud receiving 36 seats. However, Gantz received more recommendations than Netanyahu and was given the mandate to form a government. Gantz began negotiations to form a unity government with incumbent Prime Minister Benjamin Netanyahu and his Likud party. In response to this development, Yair Lapid and his Yesh Atid party, along with Moshe Ya'alon's Telem party, applied to split their factions from Blue and White. This split was officially ratified by the House Committee of the Knesset on 29 March 2020, after which Yesh Atid and Telem formed a joint parliamentary faction known as Yesh Atid–Telem.

Yesh Atid and Telem split in January 2021.

Composition 
Yesh Atid–Telem consists of two political parties which hold a combined 17 seats in the Knesset.

Leaders

Election results

References 

Liberal parties in Israel
Defunct political party alliances in Israel
Political parties established in 2020
Political parties disestablished in 2021
Zionist political parties in Israel
2020 establishments in Israel
2021 disestablishments in Israel